Timothy Upham (September 9, 1783 – November 2, 1855) was an American soldier in the War of 1812. At the Siege of Fort Erie he led the regiment under his command on a mission to rescue General Miller.

Biography
Upham's father was Reverend Timothy Upham of Deerfield, New Hampshire. His mother was Hannah, the daughter of Reverend Nathaniel Gookin of North Hampton. Timothy Upham moved to Portsmouth, New Hampshire in 1807, and opened a store on Market Street.

In June 1811, Governor John Langdon appointed Upham as one of his aides, with the rank of lieutenant colonel. Upham continued in business as a merchant until 1812, when, in anticipation of a war with Great Britain, he was commissioned as major of the 11th U.S. Infantry on March 12. In June he was appointed by the new Governor William Plumer to command the detachment of troops from New Hampshire ordered to garrison Fort McClary.

In September, Upham joined his regiment at Plattsburgh, New York. Then on January 15, 1813, he was ordered to Portland, Maine as superintendent of the recruiting district of Maine. In the spring he was promoted to the lieutenant-colonelcy of the 21st Regiment, which was assigned to join Major General James Wilkinson's army in an attack on Montreal. The campaign ended with the American defeat in the Battle of Crysler's Farm on 11 November 1813. However, elements of the 21st Regiment and Upham in particular were credited with meritorious action in that affair.

During the Siege of Fort Erie in 1814, Upham and his regiment were sent by special order of General Jacob Brown on a mission to rescue General Miller. At the close of this campaign, his health impaired, Colonel Upham was reassigned to recruiting service.

At the close of the war Upham resigned his commission and was honorably discharged on June 15, 1815. In 1816 he was appointed Collector of Customs at Portsmouth, and he continued in that office for thirteen years. In 1819, he was appointed brigadier general of the 1st Brigade, 1st Division New Hampshire Militia, and in 1820 was promoted to major general of the Division upon the resignation of General Clement Storer. This office he resigned in 1823.

After leaving the Custom House in 1829, Upham again entered upon commercial pursuits. In 1830 he made an unsuccessful bid for the office of Governor of the State of New Hampshire, running on the Republican Party ticket and losing to Matthew Harvey. In the course of the campaign, an opposition newspaper accused Upham of misappropriating customs funds. Upham sued the publishers for libel; but after a lengthy trial, the jury was unable to find a verdict.  

In 1841 he was appointed Navy Agent at Portsmouth by President Harrison. He soon resigned this office, and in 1845 removed to Charlestown, Massachusetts. His business pursuits were unsuccessful and, suffering poor health, Upham retired from active business.

Timothy Upham died in Charlestown on 2 November 1855. His remains were returned to Portsmouth where they were interred in the Proprietors Burying Ground.

References

 Powell, William Henry, List of officers of the army of the United States from 1779 to 1900, L. R. Hamersly & co., 1900.
 Heitman, Francis Bernard, Historical register of the United States Army: from its organization, September 29, 1789, to September 29, 1889, The National Tribune, 1890.
 Wilson, James Grant and Fiske, John, Appleton's Cyclopædia of American Biography, Volume 6, D. Appleton and company, 1889.
 Herringshaw, Thomas William, Herringshaw's National Library of American Biography: Contains Thirty-five Thousand Biographies of the Acknowledged Leaders of Life and Thought of the United States; Illustrated with Three Thousand Vignette Portraits, Volume 4, American Publishers' Association, 1914.
 Foster, Joseph, The soldiers' memorial. Portsmouth, N.H., 1893-1921: Storer Post, No. 1, Department of New Hampshire, Grand Army of the Republic, Portsmouth, N.H., with record of presentation of flags and portraits by the post to the city. 1890 and 1891 , Grand Army of the Republic. Dept. of New Hampshire Storer Post, No. 1 (Portsmouth), 1893.

American militia generals
United States Army personnel of the War of 1812
1783 births
1855 deaths
United States Army officers